Maysky Urban Settlement is the name of several municipal formations in Russia.

Maysky Urban Settlement, a municipal formation which the town of Maysky and five rural localities in Maysky District of the Kabardino-Balkar Republic are incorporated as
Maysky Urban Settlement, a municipal formation which the work settlement of Maysky in Sovetsko-Gavansky District of Khabarovsk Krai is incorporated as

See also
Maysky (disambiguation)

References

Notes

Sources

